Marcel Rapp (born 16 April 1979) is a German former professional footballer who played as a centre-back or as a midfielder and who is the manager of Holstein Kiel.

Managerial statistics

References

External links

1979 births
Living people
Sportspeople from Pforzheim
Footballers from Baden-Württemberg
Association football central defenders
Association football midfielders
German footballers
Germany under-21 international footballers
Germany youth international footballers
German football managers
2. Bundesliga players
Stuttgarter Kickers players
Stuttgarter Kickers II players
Karlsruher SC players
Karlsruher SC II players
FC Carl Zeiss Jena players
Rot-Weiß Oberhausen players
SC Pfullendorf players
FC Nöttingen players
3. Liga players
Bundesliga managers
2. Bundesliga managers
TSG 1899 Hoffenheim managers
Holstein Kiel managers